In mathematical analysis, the Bessel–Clifford function, named after Friedrich Bessel and William Kingdon Clifford, is an entire function of two complex variables that can be used to provide an alternative development of the theory of Bessel functions. If

is the entire function defined by means of the reciprocal gamma function, then the Bessel–Clifford function is defined by the series

The ratio of successive terms is z/k(n + k), which for all values of z and n tends to zero with increasing k. By the ratio test, this series converges absolutely for all z and n, and uniformly for all regions with bounded |z|, and hence the Bessel–Clifford function is an entire function of the two complex variables n and z.

Differential equation of the Bessel–Clifford function 

It follows from the above series on differentiating with respect to x that  satisfies the linear second-order homogeneous differential equation

This equation is of generalized hypergeometric type, and in fact the Bessel–Clifford function is up to a scaling factor a Pochhammer–Barnes hypergeometric function; we have

Unless n is a negative integer, in which case the right-hand side is undefined, the two definitions are essentially equivalent; the hypergeometric function being normalized so that its value at z = 0 is one.

Relation to Bessel functions 

The Bessel function of the first kind can be defined in terms of the Bessel–Clifford function as

when n is not an integer we can see from this that the Bessel function is not entire. Similarly, the modified Bessel function of the first kind can be defined as

The procedure can of course be reversed, so that we may define the Bessel–Clifford function as

but from this starting point we would then need to show  was entire.

Recurrence relation 

From the defining series, it follows immediately that 

which defines the recurrence relationship for the Bessel–Clifford function. This is equivalent to a similar relation for 
0F1. We have, as a special case of Gauss's continued fraction

It can be shown that this continued fraction converges in all cases.

The Bessel–Clifford function of the second kind 

The Bessel–Clifford differential equation

has two linearly independent solutions. Since the origin is a regular singular point of the differential equation, and since  is entire, the second solution must be singular at the origin.

If we set

The factor of 1/2 is inserted in order to make  correspond to the Bessel functions of the second kind. We have

and

In terms of K, we have

Generating function 

If we multiply the absolutely convergent series for exp(t) and 
exp(z/t) together, we get (when t is not zero) an absolutely convergent series for exp(t + z/t). Collecting terms in t, we find on comparison with the power series definition for  that we have

This generating function can then be used to obtain further formulas, in particular we may use Cauchy's integral formula and obtain  for integer n as

References 

.
.
.
.
.
.

Special hypergeometric functions